The Big League World Series (BLWS) Latin America Region was one of four International regions that sent teams to the World Series. The region's participation in the BLWS had dated back to 1970. Little League Baseball and Softball terminated the Big League division after the 2016 World Series.

Latin America Region Countries

Region Champions
At one point, the tournament featured 11 teams, 3 of which were from Latin America. The champions of Mexico, Puerto Rico, and Venezuela each received automatic berths. In 1989 the Central America region was created, Mexico and Panama would play a best of 3 series to determine the champion. In 1998 all three regions were combined to form the Latin America Region.

Beginning in 2006, Mexico and Puerto Rico alternated between automatic berths. In years without an auto-bid they entered the Latin America tournament.

Mexico Region Champions

Puerto Rico Region Champions

Venezuela Region Champions
 

Central America Region Champions
 

Latin America Region Champions

Results by Country

See also
Latin America Region in other Little League divisions
Little League – Latin America
Little League – Mexico
Little League – Caribbean
Intermediate League
Junior League
Senior League

References

Big League World Series
Latin America
Latin American baseball leagues